U.S. Route 277 (US 277, US-277) is a north–south United States Highway that is a spur route of U.S. Route 77. It does not connect to its parent route, US 77. It runs for 633 miles (1,019 km) across Oklahoma and Texas. US 277's northern terminus is in Newcastle, Oklahoma at Interstate 44, which is also the northern terminus of the H.E. Bailey Turnpike. Its southern terminus is in Carrizo Springs, Texas at U.S. Route 83. It passes through the states of Oklahoma and Texas.

Most of U.S. 277's route through the two states overlaps other U.S. highways. Those include U.S. 62 from Newcastle to Chickasha, Oklahoma, U.S. 62 and U.S. 281 from five miles (8 km) west of Elgin, Oklahoma, to Lawton, U.S. 281 from Lawton to Wichita Falls, Texas, U.S. 82 from Wichita Falls to Seymour, Texas, and U.S. 83 from Anson, Texas to Abilene, Texas. Through the Lawton area and again from Randlett, Oklahoma, to near downtown Wichita Falls, U.S. 277 is also co-signed with I-44.

Route description

|-
|TX
|508.9
|819.0
|-
|OK
|124.1
|199.7
|}

Texas
The highway begins at an intersection with US 83 in Carrizo Springs, about 60 miles northwest of Laredo. The highway runs in an east-west direction, until reaching Eagle Pass. From here to Del Rio, the highway parallels the Rio Grande at the U.S.-Mexico border. The highway overlaps US 377 for about 26 miles, with the highways passing the Amistad National Recreation Area.

US 277 crosses I-10 near Sonora, before traveling to Eldorado and eventually San Angelo. The highway overlaps both US 67 and US 87 in the city. In Abilene, the highway overlaps with US 83 and US 84, with the latter leaving shortly after. US 83 leaves in Anson, traveling to Aspermont, while US 277 travels to Stamford. In Seymour, US 82 begins an overlap with US 277. The two highways enter the city of Wichita Falls, with US 82 leaving the highway at US 281/US 287. US 277 joins US 281/287 and the three highways travel into the downtown area of the city, where I-44 begins. US 287 leaves the freeway, while I-44/US 277/US 281 travel to Burkburnett, before crossing the Red River into Oklahoma.

Oklahoma

From its present terminus at Interstate 44 near Newcastle (Exit 107 and starting/ending point of the H.E. Bailey Turnpike north section), U.S. 277 runs concurrent with U.S. 62 through Blanchard into downtown Chickasha, where U.S. 277 joins U.S. 81 for several miles to an intersection south of Chickasha near Ninnekah, where U.S. 277 turns west/southwest through the cities of Cement, Cyril, Fletcher and Elgin - crossing over I-44/H.E. Bailey east of Cement (no access), under the interstate south of Fletcher (no access) and under the interstate/turnpike on the west side of Elgin (Exit 53 - tolls charged northbound exit/southbound entry and no tolls southbound exit/northbound entry). About five miles west of Elgin, U.S. 277 rejoins U.S. 62 (and U.S. 281, whose concurrency with U.S. 277 to Wichita Falls, Texas begins) for the next 10 miles with the triplex 62-277-281 route joining Interstate 44 at the starting/ending point of the H.E. Bailey Turnpike north section (Exit 46) near Medicine Park south through Fort Sill to I-44 Exit 40A, where U.S. 62 diverts from the interstate. U.S. 277 and 281 continue their concurrent route with I-44 through the Lawton-Fort Sill area to a point six miles south of Lawton where I-44 becomes the H.E. Bailey Turnpike south to Randlett. At this interchange (Exit 30) which also includes Oklahoma 36 west/southwest to Chattanooga and Grandfield, U.S. 277-281 diverts east and then curve south to parallel the interstate past Geronimo, OK and 10 miles later joins Oklahoma 5 about 5 miles west of Walters for three miles west crossing over I-44/H.E. Bailey Turnpike at the Walters exit and toll plaza (Exit 21). West of I-44, U.S. 277-281 turns south from Oklahoma 5 and continues south, crossing under I-44 (with no access) south of Cookietown and then joins U.S. 70 at Randlett, from where the triplex U.S. 70-277-281 continues 3 miles west to an interchange with I-44 at the beginning/ending points of the H.E. Bailey Turnpike (Exit 6). At this interchange, U.S. 277-281 joins I-44 for the last 6 miles in Oklahoma before crossing the Red River into Texas.

Free road alternative to the H.E. Bailey Turnpike
From Newcastle to the Red River north of Wichita Falls, Texas, U.S. 277 (and concurrent sections of U.S. 62, U.S. 81 and U.S. 281) serves as an alternate free route to the two sections of the H.E. Bailey Turnpike between Oklahoma City and the Red River from Newcastle southwest of Oklahoma to near Medicine Park north of Lawton and from near Geronimo south of Lawton to Randlett just north of the Red River near Burkburnett, Texas.

Former U.S. 277 route in Lawton now U.S. 281 Business 
The former route of U.S. 277 (and 281) through the City of Lawton via 2nd Street and 11th Street (and a diagonal street connecting those two streets) has been designated as U.S. 281 Business since the completion of Lawton's Pioneer Expressway (now I-44) in 1964 from present I-44 Exit 39-B to Exit 33. Present U.S. 281 Business and former U.S. 277-281 follows 2nd Street south of I-44 (Exit 39B) into the downtown area and south of Lee Boulevard (Oklahoma 7), curves into the diagonal route to 11th Street and still locally designated by the City of Lawton as Highway 277 even though it is officially designated as U.S. 281 Business. From the end of the diagonal route at 11th and Tennessee Avenue south past the Lawton-Fort Sill Regional Airport to Exit 33 of Interstate 44, the former U.S. 277-281 and current U.S. Business 281 route follows 11th Street. South of this point, U.S. 281 Business ends/begins and current U.S. 277-281 continues to run concurrent with I-44 for another 3 miles to Exit 30 (the starting/ending point for the southern section of the H.E. Bailey Turnpike), bypassing 3 miles of the former U.S. 277-281 concurrency that followed 11th Street south of Lawton until the completion of the present I-44 route south of Lawton in 1964, when the former highway reverted to local jurisdiction. At Exit 31, Oklahoma 36 begins its route to Chattanooga and Grandfield west of I-44 while U.S. 277-281 uses the same route east of the interstate for a half-mile and turning south toward Geronimo, over the continuation of Lawton's 11th Street.

History

When US 277 was commissioned in 1930, it ended at the Mexico–United States border in Del Rio, Texas. It was extended southeast to its present terminus in 1952. The original northern terminus was in Oklahoma City at its intersection with parent route US 77 and US 62. The northern terminus remained there until 1964. when it was truncated to its present terminus following the completion of the H.E. Bailey Turnpike and the connecting US 62 freeway into Oklahoma City, which would become I-44 in the 1980s. The section of highway through Wichita Falls was recently upgraded to a freeway. Known as Kell Boulevard, the freeway opened in late-2009/early-2010.

As of February 2010, US 277 allows a speed limit of  only in Dimmit County, Texas.

Major intersections

Business U.S. Route 277

Wichita Falls, Texas
Holliday, Texas
Seymour, Texas
Munday, Texas
Weinert, Texas
Haskell, Texas
Stamford, Texas
Eagle Pass, Texas

See also

Related routes
 U.S. Route 77
 U.S. Route 177
 U.S. Route 377

References

External links

 Endpoints of U.S. Highway 277

77-2
77-2
277
2
Transportation in Dimmit County, Texas
Transportation in Maverick County, Texas
Transportation in Kinney County, Texas
Transportation in Val Verde County, Texas
Transportation in Edwards County, Texas
Transportation in Sutton County, Texas
Transportation in Schleicher County, Texas
Transportation in Tom Green County, Texas
Transportation in Coke County, Texas
Transportation in Runnels County, Texas
Transportation in Nolan County, Texas
Transportation in Taylor County, Texas
Transportation in Jones County, Texas
Transportation in Haskell County, Texas
Transportation in Knox County, Texas
Transportation in Baylor County, Texas
Transportation in Archer County, Texas
Transportation in Wichita County, Texas
Transportation in Cotton County, Oklahoma
Transportation in Comanche County, Oklahoma
Transportation in Caddo County, Oklahoma
Transportation in Grady County, Oklahoma
Transportation in McClain County, Oklahoma
77-2